The following is a list of individuals who have served as a member of the Federal Trade Commission (FTC) beginning in 1949.

List of current commissioners

Current members of the FTC 
The commission is headed by five commissioners, who each serve seven-year terms. Commissioners are nominated by the president and confirmed by the Senate. No more than three commissioners can be of the same political party. In practice, this means that two commissions are of the opposition party. However, three members of the FTC throughout its history have been without party affiliation, with the most recent independent, Pamela Jones Harbour, serving from 2003 to 2009.

List of former commissioners 
The following is a list of individuals who have served as a member of the Federal Trade Commission (FTC) beginning in 1949, including party affiliation.

Backgrounds of commissioners

Demographics 
As of 2021, there have been:

 Three African-Americans to serve on the FTC: A. Leon Higginbotham Jr. (served from 1962 to 1964), Mozelle W. Thompson (served from 1997 to 2004), Pamela Jones Harbour (served from 2003 to 2009). 
 Three Asian-Americans to serve on the FTC: Dennis Yao (served from 1991 to 1994), Rohit Chopra (served since 2018), and Lina Khan (served since 2021); Khan is the first Asian-American to serve as FTC Chair.
 Three independents to serve on the FTC: Philip Elman (served from 1961 to 1970), Mary Azcuenaga (served from 1984 to 1998), and Pamela Jones Harbour (served from 2003 to 2009)

Career backgrounds 
The vast majority of FTC members have been individuals with legal backgrounds, with notable exceptions. President Ronald Reagan appointed the first two professional economists, James C. Miller III and George W. Douglas, to serve on the body. Dennis Yao, a Democrat who served from 1991 to 1994, held a Ph.D in economics, and Joshua D. Wright, a Republican who served from 2013 to 2015, held a both a J.D. and a Ph.D. in economics.

References 

Federal Trade Commission
Federal Trade Commission personnel